Ilya Aleksandrovich Musin (– 6 June 1999) was a Soviet conductor, music teacher and a theorist of conducting.

Life and career
Musin was born in the provincial town of Kostroma. His father, Jewish a watchmaker, pushed him to become a pianist. His mother died when he was six.

Musin first studied conducting under Nikolai Malko and Aleksandr Gauk. He became assistant to Fritz Stiedry with the Saint Petersburg Philharmonic Orchestra in 1934. The Soviet government later sent him to lead the State Belarusian Orchestra, but then curtailed his conducting career because he never joined the Soviet Communist Party.

He then turned to teaching, creating a school of conducting that is still referred to as the "Leningrad school of conducting". He spent 1941–45 in Tashkent, Uzbekistan, where most Russian intellectuals were kept safe during the war. There he continued conducting and teaching. On June 22, 1942, the anniversary of the Nazi invasion, he conducted the second performance of Shostakovich's Leningrad Symphony.

In 1932, Musin was invited to teach conducting at the Saint Petersburg Conservatory, then known as the Leningrad Conservatory. He developed a comprehensive theoretical system to enable the student to communicate with the orchestra with the hands, requiring minimal verbal instruction. No one had previously formulated such a detailed and clear system of conducting gestures. Apparently, his own early experiences as a student had prompted him to study the intricacies of manual technique. When Musin tried to enter Malko's conducting class at the Leningrad Conservatory in 1926, he had been denied entrance because of poor manual technique. He pleaded with Malko to be accepted provisionally, and eventually became an authority on manual technique, describing his system in his book The Technique of Conducting.

Musin described the main principle of his method in these words: "A conductor must make music visible to his musicians with his hands. There are two components to conducting, expressiveness and exactness. These two components are in dialectical opposition to each other; in fact, they cancel each other out. A conductor must find the way to bring the two together."

Throughout a teaching career spanning more than sixty years, his best-known students include: Rudolf Barshai, Semyon Bychkov, Tugan Sokhiev, Sabrie Bekirova, Oleg Caetani, Vassily Sinaisky, Konstantin Simeonov, Odysseas Dimitriadis, Vladislav Chernushenko, Victor Fedotov, Leonid Shulman, Arnold Katz, Andrei Chistyakov, Sian Edwards, Martyn Brabbins, Kim Ji Hoon, Peter Jermihov, Alexander Walker, Yuri Temirkanov, Valeri Guergiev, Teodor Currentzis, Ennio Nicotra, Ricardo Chiavetta, Leonid Korchmar, and Oleg Proskurnya (who he was Musin's assistant for the International Conducting Workshop and founded the Advanced Conducting Academy to continue the work of Ilyá Musin).1
In 1993-5, he taught at the Estate Musicale Chigiana summer school in Siena, Italy.
In 1994, he gave masterclasses at the Royal Academy of Music in London.

Books
 Ilya Musin, The Technique of Conducting (Техника дирижирования), Moscow : Muzyka Publishing House, 1967.
 English Translation by Oleg Proskurnya, The Techniques of Orchestral Conducting by Ilia Musin, Lewiston, N.Y. : Edwin Mellen Press, 2014.

Further reading 
 Ennio Nicotra, Introduction to the orchestral conducting Technique in accordance with the orchestral conducting school of Ilya Musin. Book + DVD, English, Italian, German and Spanish text. Edizioni Curci Milano, Italy 2007

External links
 Ilya Musin Society (Italy)
 Círculo Musin (Spain)
 
 Ilya Musin Kolor (Spain)
 New site about Ilya Musin video photo (Russia)
 * ILYA MUSIN orchestral conducting lesson. Excerpt from lesson on Beethoven I 1st mov

References

1904 births
1999 deaths
Academic staff of Saint Petersburg Conservatory
Soviet conductors (music)